The 2019 Hazfi Cup Final was the 32nd final since 1975. The match was held between Persepolis and Damash in Foolad Arena, Ahvaz.

In this match Persepolis won 1–0 against Damash and won the championship of this competition.

Detalis

References

Hazfi Cup Final
Persepolis F.C. matches
2019